Submission was a theme park ride at Alton Towers in Staffordshire, England from 2001 until 2013.  It was a Chance Rides double winging inverter

History 
Submission opened in 2001 in the X-Sector area of Alton Towers. The slogan used in advertisement was 'Hang in there'.  From 2005, the ride only operated one of its arms to save electricity, and the ride's cycles were shortened.   The ride was closed and disassembled in 2013.

Description 
Submission was painted blue and was covered in a shiny metal.. Each of its two arms had a counterweight in the shape of two metal spikes, which would sweep near to the ground like a scythe. The sequence was always the same, different from some other weight-based rides that have numerous sequences. The ride type itself is a flat ride.

Breakdowns occasionally happened and, as a result, queues were very short.

Ride experience
Submission was a simple ride, featuring a central tower with two gondolas attached to rotating arms on each side. Each gondola contained 6 rows of 4. When the ride started, the gondola was lifted 90 degrees back and forth, slightly tilting forwards and backwards and gradually rotated in a full circle with the gondola spinning the opposite way to the arm, making the riders go upside down. 

As the arm would move in one direction, the gondola would tilt in the other way. Because of the double sided seating which saw riders sitting back-to-back, when one arm moved one way, there would be one set of riders tilted vertically, pointing to the ground, not dissimilar from Oblivion. When the gondola reached its highest point, it was turned upside-down.

References

Alton Towers
2001 establishments in England
2013 disestablishments in England
Amusement rides introduced in 2001
Amusement rides that closed in 2013